Prato is a city in Tuscany, Italy.

Prato may also refer to:

Places

Italy
Prato allo Stelvio or Prad am Stilfser Joch, a municipality in South Tyrol
Province of Prato, a province of Tuscany
Mount Prato, a mountain in the Apennines

Switzerland
Prato (Leventina), a municipality in the canton of Ticino
Prato-Sornico, a former municipality in the canton of Ticino
Prato, a village in Prato-Sornico

People
Leopoldo Prato (1845-1896), Italian major
Katharina Prato (1818–1897), 19th-century Austrian cookbook writer

Other uses
A.C. Prato, an Italian football club of the city of Prato
Queijo prato, a type of Brazilian cheese
Prato (cookbook) or The South German Cuisine, an 1858 cookbook by Katharina Prato

See also
Prata (disambiguation)